Jennifer "Jenny" Gillen Toomey (born 1968) is an American indie rock musician and arts activist.

Career 
Toomey was a member of the bands Geek, Tsunami, Liquorice, Grenadine, So Low and Choke, among others, and has also recorded under her own name.

In 1990, Toomey co-founded the Simple Machines record label with a housemate who left the project soon after. Toomey ran the label with Kristin Thomson from 1990 to 1998 out of their house in Arlington, Virginia. Along with TeenBeat Records and Dischord Records, Simple Machines helped document the D.C. punk and indie rock scenes. Tsunami was also greatly influential in the do it yourself (D.I.Y.) movement among the punk, grunge and indie communities. Among the artists released on Simple Machines are Tsunami, Grenadine, Franklin Bruno, Ida, Scrawl, Dave Grohl (recording under the name Late!) and Retsin, among others. Through Simple Machines, Toomey and Thomson released The Mechanic's Guide, a DIY music guidebook which was  influential in the independent music scene of the 1990s.

In 2000, Toomey founded the Future of Music Coalition, a Washington, D.C. think tank that translates the complex issues at the intersection of music, policy and law, aiming to help (primarily independent) musicians, including intellectual property rights, health insurance, and the effects of corporate consolidation of radio and the music industry. She was the founding executive director.

As part of her advocacy work, Toomey participated in many conferences, including the Future of the Music Industry forum held at Georgetown University in January 2003, among others.

In November 2007, she was appointed Program Officer for Media and Cultural Policy in the Media, Arts and Culture Unit at the Ford Foundation, where she would later serve as Director, Internet Freedom, and where she is currently the International Program Director, Technology and Society.

Discography
with Choke
 Kingdom of Mattresses (1990)
with Geek
 Wedge (Various Artists) (1990)
 Three's Company (Various Artists) (1990)
 Screw (Various Artists) (1991)
 Hammer
with My New Boyfriend
 Pulley (Various Artists) (1991)
 Supersaw
with Slack
 Neapolitan Metropolitan (Various Artists) (1992)
 Bates Stamper
with Grenadine
 Goya (1992)
 Trilogy (1992)
 Don't Forget the Halo (1993)
 Nopalitos (1994)
 Christiansen (1994)
with Tsunami
 Deep End (1993)
 The Heart's Tremolo (1994)
 World Tour and Other Destinations (1995)
 A Brilliant Mistake (1997)
with Liquorice
 Stalls (1995)
 Listening Cap (1995)

Solo
 Antidote (2001)
 Tempting (2002)

References

External links 
 
 Jenny Toomey at the Ford Foundation
 

1968 births
Living people
American activists
American feminist writers
Copyright activists
American indie rock musicians
American women rock singers
Georgetown College (Georgetown University) alumni
Misra Records artists
21st-century American women